A ceremony is a unified ritualistic event with a purpose.

Ceremony, Ceremonial, or other variants may also refer to:

Film
 The Ceremony (1963 film), an American crime film directed by Laurence Harvey
 The Ceremony (1971 film), a Japanese film directed by Nagisa Ōshima
 Ceremony (film), a 2011 American film directed by Max Winkler

Literature
 Ceremony (Parker novel), a 1982 Spenser novel by Robert B. Parker
 Ceremony (Silko novel), a 1977 novel by Leslie Marmon Silko
 The Ceremonies (novel), a 1984 novel by T. E. D. Klein

Music

Performers
 Ceremony (punk band), an American punk band
 The Ceremonies (band), an American rock band
 Ceremony, Chaz Bono's band from the 1990s

Albums
 Ceremony (Anna von Hausswolff album), 2013
 Ceremony (The Cult album) or the title song, 1991
 Ceremony (King Gnu album), 2020
 Ceremony (Phantogram album) or the title song, 2020
 Ceremony (Spooky Tooth and Pierre Henry album), 1969
 Ceremony: Remixes & Rarities, by Santana, 2003
 Ceremony – A New Order Tribute, a various artists compilation, 2010
 Ceremonial (Savage Republic album) or the title song, 1985
 Ceremonial (Pink Cream 69 album), 2013
 Ceremonials, by Florence and the Machine, 2011

EPs
 Ceremony (EP), by Pentagon, 2017
 The Ceremonies (EP), by the Ceremonies, 2013

Songs
 "Ceremony" (Joe Satriani song), 1998
 "Ceremony" (New Order song), 1981
 "The Ceremony" (song), by George Jones and Tammy Wynette, 1972
 "The Ceremony", by Oh Land from Askepot, 2016
 "Ceremony", by Deftones from Ohms, 2020

Technology 
 The Ceremony (cryptography), a trusted setup procedure executed to create the Zcash private key

Other 
 Ceremonial magic, practices and rituals related to supernatural magic